David William Dowd (February 7, 1921 – October 20, 1988) was an American Republican Party politician and minor league baseball player with the New York Yankees organization.

Early life
Dowd was born in West Orange, New Jersey on February 7, 1921. He was the son of Thomas A. Dowd and Margaret J. Dowd.  His father owned a real estate brokerage firm.  Dowd attended Livingston High School, Villanova University and received his law degree from Rutgers University.  He was married to Connie Sansone Dowd and had seven children.

Baseball career

In 1942, Dowd signed a contract with the New York Yankees and was assigned to the Wellsville Yankees in the New York–Penn League. He played in 11 games, with a .182 batting average.  His teammates included future Yankees Jerry Coleman and Charlie Silvera.  Dowd's baseball career ended later that season when he joined the U.S. Army during World War II.

Political career

Dowd first ran for office in his hometown of Livingston, New Jersey when he was elected to the Township Council in 1956.  He was re-elected in 1960.  Dowd served as Mayor of Livingston in 1958 and in 1963.

Dowd ran for the New Jersey State Senate in 1967.  He won a hotly contested primary on a Reform Republican slate, finishing fourth in a field of thirteen candidates for six Senate seats elected at-large in Essex County. The General Election turned out to be a strong environment for Republicans; it was the mid-term election of Governor Richard J. Hughes's second term.  Republicans won all six Senate seats, with Dowd running fifth.  The four Democratic Senators elected in 1965 -- Nicholas Fernicola, John J. Giblin, Maclyn Goldman and Hutchins Inge—were all defeated.

On November 16, 1970, Dowd resigned from the Senate to become the General Counsel of the New Jersey Turnpike Authority. He held that post until 1974.

Later life
Dowd practiced law in New Jersey and lived in Howell Township, New Jersey and in Florida.  He died in 1988 at age 67.

Election results

1967 Republican State Senate Primary results

1967 Essex County State Senator General Election results

References 

Wellsville Yankees players
Mayors of places in New Jersey
People from Livingston, New Jersey
People from West Orange, New Jersey
Politicians from Essex County, New Jersey
Republican Party New Jersey state senators
1921 births
1975 deaths
20th-century American politicians
United States Army personnel of World War II